As of July 2015, the Pentax HD DA 560mm F5.6 ED AW is the longest prime lens in production under the Pentax brand. It has a telescope-type optical design. 
The lens is fully compatible with the K-1 full-frame DSLR and covers the 35mm image circle. On the K-1, lens correction profiles are supported to remove chromatic aberrations and vignetting.

References

External links

Official product page, Ricoh Imaging
Press release, Ricoh Imaging
Examples of images list, PENTAX K-1 Laboratory
A look at the Pentax 560mm f5.6, YouTube
DA 560mm F5.6 ED AW Review, PentaxForums.com
DA 560mm F5.6 vs Sigma 500mm F4.5 Review, PentaxForums.com
DA 560mm F5.6 - is it a Full-frame lens?, PentaxForums.com

560
Camera lenses introduced in 2012